Raffaello De Ruggieri (born 24 October 1935 in Matera) is an Italian politician.

De Ruggieri ran as an independent for the office of Mayor of Matera at the 2015 Italian local elections, supported by a centre-right coalition. He won and took office on 15 June 2015.

See also
2015 Italian local elections
List of mayors of Matera

References

External links
 

1935 births
Living people
Mayors of Matera